"Lately" is a song by American singer Stevie Wonder recorded for his album Hotter than July (1980). The song reached number three in the United Kingdom, and was later covered by R&B group Jodeci and released as a promotional single for the live album Uptown MTV Unplugged in June 1993, which reached number one on the R&B charts and the top 5 on the Billboard Hot 100.

Critical reception
Record World called it a "touching ballad [that] is perhaps his most beautiful, revealing work yet."

Jason Elias at Allmusic retrospectively praised the song, believing that unlike some of Wonder's similar material, "Lately" in particular hit all the perfect emotional and musical notes. Of the song's emotional power itself Elias stated, "it's enough to make a listener fall prey to an old-fashioned cry."

Personnel 
 Stevie Wonder – lead vocals, bass synthesizer, piano

Jodeci version

"Lately" was notably covered by R&B group Jodeci for the Uptown MTV Unplugged release in 1993. Executive producer Andre Harrell referred to it as their "End of the Road", analogous to the chart-topping single for Boyz II Men. The group's version of the song was released as a promotional single, claiming the number one spot on the Hot R&B/Hip-Hop Singles & Tracks charts as the group's fourth R&B number one hit. It was also Jodeci's highest peaking pop hit, reaching number four on the Billboard Hot 100 in August 1993. It sold 900,000 copies and was certified gold by the Recording Industry Association of America. This version also appears on Back to the Future: The Very Best of Jodeci, a greatest hits album from the group, released by Universal Records in 2005.

The group also recorded an alternate studio version of the song, produced by group leader DeVante Swing. It is slightly longer than the Uptown MTV Unplugged version and features an additional outro.  They performed this version on The Arsenio Hall Show, with Stevie Wonder making a guest appearance and performing the song with Jodeci.

Chart performance

Stevie Wonder

Jodeci version

Year-end charts

Certifications

See also
List of number-one R&B singles of 1993 (U.S.)

References

External links
 

1981 singles
1993 singles
Stevie Wonder songs
Jodeci songs
Tamla Records singles
Soul ballads
Rhythm and blues ballads
Songs written by Stevie Wonder
1980 songs
1980s ballads
Song recordings produced by Stevie Wonder